26th National Board of Review Awards
December 20, 1954
The 26th National Board of Review Awards were announced on December 20, 1954.

Top Ten Films 
On the Waterfront
Seven Brides for Seven Brothers
The Country Girl
A Star Is Born
Executive Suite
The Vanishing Prairie
Sabrina
20,000 Leagues Under the Sea
The Unconquered
Beat the Devil

Top Foreign Films 
Romeo and Juliet
The Heart of the Matter
Gate of Hell
Diary of a Country Priest
The Little Kidnappers
Genevieve
Beauties of the Night
Mr. Hulot's Holiday
The Detective
Bread, Love and Dreams

Winners 
Best Film: On the Waterfront
Best Foreign Film: Romeo and Juliet
Best Actor: Bing Crosby (The Country Girl)
Best Actress: Grace Kelly (The Country Girl, Dial M for Murder, Rear Window)
Best Supporting Actor: John Williams (Sabrina, Dial M for Murder)
Best Supporting Actress: Nina Foch (Executive Suite)
Best Director: Renato Castellani (Romeo and Juliet)

External links 
National Board of Review of Motion Pictures :: Awards for 1954

1954
1954 film awards
1954 in American cinema
1954 awards in the United States
December 1954 events in the United States